Taminango is a town and municipality in the Nariño Department, Colombia.  It was founded in 1704. As of 2015, Taminango had a population of 20,537.

Municipalities of Nariño Department